Happy Creek is a railway station on the Walhalla narrow gauge line in Gippsland, Victoria, Australia. The station was built during the re-construction of line between Thomson and Walhalla as a temporary terminus station, it was used as this from the time it opened until early 2002 when the line to Walhalla was completed.

Victoria (Australia) tourist railway stations
Transport in Gippsland (region)
Shire of Baw Baw
Walhalla railway line